Winnecke Catalogue of Double Stars is a list of seven "new" double stars published by German Astronomer August Winnecke in Astronomische Nachrichten in 1869.  Winnecke later noted that three of the double stars he catalogued had been discovered earlier (30 Eridani, Bradley 757, and 44 Cygni).  The stars are sometimes given Winnecke designations (e.g. Winnecke 4), and sometimes abbreviated to WNC.

References

External links 
 Winnecke Objects from SEDS
 A biography of August Winnecke from SEDS

Astronomical catalogues of stars

Double stars